Wednesbury Parkway is a tram stop in Wednesbury, Sandwell, England. It was opened on 31 May 1999 and has park and ride facilities. It is situated on Midland Metro Line 1. The stop has a third track alongside running into the tram depot which is a short distance east. It also has a third platform on this track, for services terminating or starting here.

Services
Mondays to Fridays, Midland Metro services in each direction between Birmingham and Wolverhampton run at six to eight-minute intervals during the day, and at fifteen-minute intervals during the evenings and on Sundays. They run at eight minute intervals on Saturdays.

References

 Article on this Metro stop from Rail Around Birmingham & the West Midlands
 Article on this Metro stop from thetrams.co.uk

West Midlands Metro stops
Transport in Sandwell
Wednesbury
Railway stations in Great Britain opened in 1999